The Brantford and District Labour Council is a labour council in Brantford, Ontario, Canada. It is affiliated with the Canadian Labour Congress.

External links
Brantford and District Labour Council

References

Trade unions in Ontario
Trades councils
Canadian Labour Congress
Brantford